Baisha (Taishanese: Bak-sa) is a town of Taishan, Guangdong province. , it has two residential communities and 18 villages under its administration.

History
Baisha town was the ancestral home of many of the first Chinese Canadians.  Their descendants live all over Canada, and used to predominate before the 1980s in the Chinatowns of Victoria, Vancouver, Calgary, Banff and Edmonton, and US West Coast cities such as San Francisco and Seattle. 

Citation: https://asian.library.ubc.ca/files/2011/08/Head-Tax-brochure2-1.pdf

Economy
Baisha Town is one of the few regions in northern Guangdong province where illegal rare earth mines were operating. Baisha Town is rich in rare earth minerals such as dysprosium.

Dialect 

The Baisha variant of Taishanese is fading amongst the descendants of Canadian-Chinese, as Cantonese and Mandarin become more dominant.  Based on observations of Chinese-Canadian elders living in Edmonton between 1980 and 2005, it would seem that the Taishan language spoken in Baisha in the mid-20th century differed somewhat from that spoken in Taicheng (Hoiseng in the Hoisan language, 台城), the county seat of Taishan (Hoisan, 台山县). Indeed, the pronunciation was more or less the same as that of people living across the river in the next county, Kaiping (Hoiping in the Toisanese language, 开平). One notable difference can be seen in the shift of certain vowel sounds, as follows:

References 

Taishan, Guangdong
Towns in Guangdong